Tara Aghdashloo  (born 5 January 1988) is an Iranian-Canadian writer, director, producer and curator. She is a published author of her poetry collection, and has worked as a print and broadcast journalist in Persian and English-language media, before transitioning to films.

Biography 
Tara Aghdashloo was born 5 January 1988  in Tehran, to architect Firouzeh "Fay" Athari and painter Aydin Aghdashloo. When she was in high school her family moved to Toronto, Canada.

Work

Film and television 
As a journalist, director, producer, Tara has worked with Channel 4 News, and BBC World. She wrote, directed and produced Value of Contemporary Art, Riksdag, Ticket documentary-series, and the seven-part docuseries City Map, among others. She was a founding co-host and producer on the first Persian-speaking all-woman talk show, Samte No on Manoto TV channel. Starting in 2017 she independently produced and directed on her debut feature documentary, Chiaroscuro: Capturing my Father. In 2019, she directed the music video 'Circles' for Choubi by Yasmine Hamdan  and commercials  as well.

Writing 
Her poetry has appear in English language and Persian magazines, and her poetry collection, This is Not a Pomegranate, was published by Shahrvand Publications in 2011. Her essays, articles and reviews have been published in The Guardian, REALLIFE Magazine, The New Inquiry, Tank Magazine, Autodidact Magazine, Ibraaz, Fashion Magazine, ArtRabbit, Ottawa Citizen, Future Fossil Flora Magazine, Reorient Magazine, BULLETT and Capsule 98  among others. Tara wrote the lyrics for King Raam's debut solo album, Songs of The Wolves.

Curation 
Tara co-directed and curated The Invisible Line (TIL) Gallery in East London for two years and exhibited around 25 shows during that time. In 2017 she curated a retrospective of Portuguese artist Cristina Rodrigues in Castelo Branco Museum. She frequently reviews art especially by Iranian and Middle Eastern artists.

Filmography

References

External links 
Official website

Tara Aghdashloo (2018) in Harpers Bazaar Arabia magazine

1988 births
Living people
Writers from Tehran
Iranian contemporary artists
Iranian emigrants to Canada
Canadian expatriates in England